Clemens Emil Franz Bracht (23 November 1877 – 26 November 1933) was a German jurist and politician.

Born in Berlin, he studied law at the University of Würzburg and the University of Berlin. He joined the Centre Party and on 18 December 1924 became Supreme Burgomaster (Oberbürgermeister) of Essen. After the Preußenschlag enacted by German Chancellor Franz von Papen and President Paul von Hindenburg, Bracht was appointed a "Deputy Commissioner" for the Interior in the Free State of Prussia on 27 July 1932. He left the Centre Party and resigned as Burgomaster on 31 October 1932.

On 29 October 1932 he had become a Minister without portfolio in Papen's cabinet. Under Chancellor Kurt von Schleicher he briefly served as Reich Minister of the Interior from 3 December  1932. He had to resign, when Hindenburg appointed Hitler Chancellor on 30 January 1933.

External links
 

1877 births
1933 deaths
Politicians from Berlin
Centre Party (Germany) politicians
Jurists from Berlin
Weimar Republic politicians
Interior ministers of Prussia
Mayors of Essen